Lois Wilson (June 28, 1894 – March 3, 1988) was an American actress who worked during the silent film era. She also directed two short films and was a scenario writer.

Early life
Born to Andrew Kenley Wilson and Constance (née Coolidge) in Pittsburgh, Pennsylvania, Wilson's family moved to Alabama when she was still very young. She earned a degree from Alabama Normal College (now the University of West Alabama), and became a school teacher for young children, soon leaving to pursue a film career. 

In 1915, Wilson moved to California after winning a beauty contest put on by Universal Studios and the Birmingham News. This pageant was the predecessor to the Miss Alabama/Miss America pageant system, and Wilson is considered the first Miss Alabama. Upon arriving in Hollywood, she auditioned and was hired by the Victor Film Company for several small film roles.

In 1916, she visited Chicago, where she met pioneer female film director Lois Weber, who gave her a small part in her film The Dumb Girl of Portici, which starred famed ballerina Anna Pavlova. Weber then took her to Los Angeles, where she was groomed for stardom and began playing leads opposite actors such as J. Warren Kerrigan and Frank Keenan.

Career

After appearing in several films at various studios, Wilson settled in at Paramount Pictures in 1919, where she remained until 1927. She was a WAMPAS Baby Star of 1922, and appeared in 150 movies. Her most recognized screen portrayals are Molly Wingate in The Covered Wagon (1923), in which she was well reviewed, and Daisy Buchanan in the silent film version of The Great Gatsby (1926). She acted opposite male stars such as Rudolph Valentino and John Gilbert.

Wilson played both romantic leads and character parts. Despite making a successful transition to sound, Wilson was dissatisfied with the roles she received in the 1930s, and she soon retired in 1941, making only three films after 1939. Lois ventured to Broadway and television following her final role in The Girl from Jones Beach (1949) with Ronald Reagan. Wilson played in the network soap operas The Guiding Light in 1951, The Secret Storm and The Edge of Night. She portrayed featured character roles.

Wilson was also the model of the official poster for "America Welcomes the World", the Philadelphia Sesquicentennial Celebration, in 1926.

In 1934, her performance in No Greater Glory inspired a Birmingham, Alabama sculptor to create a monument for the city's celebration of World Peace Day.

Personal life

She was once described as having a screen image of "the soft, marrying kind of woman"; in real life, however, she never married. She was chosen by Paramount Pictures to represent the motion picture industry at the British Empire Exposition of 1924. She was described as "a typical example of the American girl in character, culture and beauty".

Death
Lois Wilson died of pneumonia at the Riverside Hospital for Skilled Care in Reno, Nevada at age 93. Her funeral service was conducted at the Church of the Good Shepherd in Beverly Hills, California.  She was buried at Forest Lawn Memorial Park in nearby Glendale.

Filmography
The following is a list of films that Lois Wilson either directed, acted in, wrote or produced:

Silent films

The Palace of Dust (1915, Short) as Beatrix
The New Adventures of Terence O'Rourke (1915) as Beatrix
When a Queen Loved O'Rourke (1915, Short) as Beatrix
The Road to Paradise (1915, Short) as Beatrix
The Hypocrite (1915, Extant)
Langdon's Legacy (1916) as Pepita
The Dumb Girl of Portici (1916, Extant)
Married on the Wing (1916, Short) as Grace Darling
The Pool of Flame (1916) as Princess Beatrix
The Gay Lord Waring (1916) as Helen Von Gerold
Hulda the Silent (1916, Short) as Hulda Anderson
A Son of the Immortals (1916) as Joan Cameron
The Decoy (1916, Mutual film)
The Silent Battle (1916) as Jane Loring
He Wrote a Book (1916, Short) as Jennie
The Beckoning Trail (1916) as Mary Helton
Arthur's Desperate Resolve (1916, Short) as Sibly Grey
The White Man's Law (1916)
A Soul at Stake (1916, Short) as Clementina Fairwood
The Decoy (1916, Short, Universal film) as Felese
Her Chance (1916, Short) as Frances Martin
The Morals of Hilda (1916) as Marion
Green Eyes (1916, Short) as Julia
Alone in the World (1917, Lost, Short: wrote, directed)
The Whispered Name (1917, Short) as Madeline Evers
Black Evidence (1917, Short) as Mary
Won by Grit (1917, Short) as Teresa
Flames of Treachery (1917, Short) as Ruth Chalmers
Treason (1917) as Floria Natarre
Parentage (1917) as Mrs. Melton
Alimony (1917) as Marjorie Lansing
His Robe of Honor (1918) as Laura Nelson
 The Turn of a Card (1918) as Cynthia Burdette
One Dollar Bid (1918) as Virginia Dare
Maid o' the Storm (1918) as Elaine Shackleford
 A Burglar for a Night (1918) as Janet Leslie
The Bells (1918) as Annette
 Prisoners of the Pines (1918) as Rosalie Dufresne
Three X Gordon (1918) as Dorrie Webster
A Man's Man (1918) as Dolores Ruey
The Drifters (1919, Lost) as The Girl
Come Again Smith (1919, Lost) as Lucy Stevens
The End of the Game (1919, Extant) as Mary Miller
Gates of Brass (1919, Lost) as Margaret Blake
The Best Man (1919, Lost) as Celia Hathaway
A Man's Fight (1919, Lost) as Mary Tompkins
Love Insurance (1919, Lost) as Cynthia Meyrick
Why Smith Left Home (1919, Incomplete, Library of Congress) as Marian
The Price Woman Pays (1919, Lost) as Louise
It Pays to Advertise (1919, Lost) as Mary Grayson
Too Much Johnson (1919, Lost) as Mrs. Billings
Who's Your Servant? (1920, Lost) as Madeline Bancroft
Thou Art the Man (1920, Lost) as Joan Farrant
The City of Masks (1920, Lost) as Miss Emsdale
What's Your Hurry? (1920, Extant, Gosfilmofond) as Virginia MacMurran
A Full House (1920, Lost) as Ottilie Howell
Burglar Proof (1920, Lost) as Laura Lowell
Midsummer Madness (1920, Extant, Library of Congress) as Margaret Meredith
What Every Woman Knows (1921, Lost) as Maggie Wylie
The City of Silent Men (1921, Lost) as Molly Bryant
The Lost Romance (1921, Incomplete, Library of Congress) as Sylvia Hayes
The Hell Diggers (1921, Lost) as Dora Wade
Miss Lulu Bett (1921, Extant, Library of Congress) as Lulu Bett
The World's Champion (1922, Incomplete, Library of Congress) as Lady Elizabeth
Is Matrimony a Failure? (1922, Lost) as Mabel Hoyt
Our Leading Citizen (1922, Lost) as Katherine Fendle, his fiancée
Manslaughter (1922, Extant, Library of Congress, George Eastman House) as Evans - Lydia's Maid
Without Compromise (1922, Lost) as Jean Ainsworth
Broad Daylight (1922, Lost) as Nora Fay
The Covered Wagon (1923, Extant, Paramount Pictures) as Molly Wingate
Bella Donna (1923, Extant, Gosfilmofond) as Patricia
Only 38 (1923, Lost) as Mrs. Stanley
A Man's Man (1923, Lost) as Lois Wilson
To the Last Man (1923, Extant, Gosfilmofond) as Ellen Jorth
Ruggles of Red Gap (1923, Lost) as Kate Kenner
The Call of the Canyon (1923, Extant, Gosfilmofond 2010) as Carley Burch
Pied Piper Malone (1924, 'Extant, Gosfilmofond) as Patty Thomas
Icebound (1924, Lost) as Jane Crosby
Another Scandal (1924, Lost) as Beatrice Vanderdyke
The Man Who Fights Alone (1924) as Marion
Monsieur Beaucaire (1924, Extant, Library of Congress) as Queen Marie of France
North of 36 (1924, Extant, Library of Congress) as Taisie Lockheart
Contraband (1925, Lost) as Carmel Lee
The Thundering Herd (1925, Lost) as Milly Fayre
Welcome Home (1925, Extant, Library of Congress) as Nettie Prouty
Marry Me (1925, Lost) (uncredited)
Rugged Water (1925; Lost) as Norma Bartlett
The Vanishing American (1925, Extant, Library of Congress) as Marion Warner
The King on Main Street (1925, Extant) as Hotel guest in lobby (cameo appearance) ( uncredited)
Irish Luck (1925, Extant) as Lady Gwendolyn
Bluebeard's Seven Wives (1925 Lost) as Mary Kelly
Let's Get Married (1926, Extant, Library of Congress) as Mary Corbin
Fascinating Youth (1926) as Lois Wilson
The Show-Off (1926, Extant, Library of Congress) as Amy Fisher
The Great Gatsby (1926, Lost) as Daisy Buchanan
New York (1927, Lost) as Marjorie Church
Broadway Nights (1927, Lost) as Fanny Franchette
The Gingham Girl (1927) as Mary Thompson
Alias the Lone Wolf (1927, Extant, UCLA Film & TV, per IMDb) as Eve de Montalais
French Dressing (1927, Lost) as Cynthia Grey
Coney Island (1928) as Joan Wellman
Miss Information (1928, Short) as The Public Stenographer
Ransom (1928, Lost) as Lois Brewster
Sally's Shoulders (1928) as Sally

Sound films

On Trial (1928, Lost) as May Strickland
Object: Alimony (1928, Columbia, Lost) as Ruth Rutledge
Conquest (1928, Lost) as Diane Holden
A Bird in the Hand (1929, Short, Incomplete, reel#2) as The Wife
Kid Gloves (1929, Lost, IMDb) as Ruth
The Gamblers (1929, Lost) as Catherine Darwin
Her Husband's Women (1929, Short) as The Painter's Jealous Wife
The Show of Shows (1929, Extant) as Performer in 'Bicycle Built for Two' Number
Wedding Rings (1929,Lost) as Cornelia Quinn
For Love or Money (1930, Short, Extant UCLA unpreserved nitrate)
The Furies (1930, Lost) as Fifi Sands
Lovin' the Ladies (1930, Extant, Library of Congress) as Joan Bently
Temptation (1930, Extant, Library of Congress) as Julie
Once a Gentleman (1930, Lost) as Mrs. Mallin
Seed (1931) as Peggy Carter
The Age for Love (1931, Lost) as Sylvia Pearson
The Expert (1932, Extant, Library of Congress) as Nettie Minick
The Rider of Death Valley (1932, Extant) as Helen Joyce
Drifting Souls (1932, Extant) as Linda Lawrence
Divorce in the Family (1932, Extant) as Mrs. Shumaker
The Crash (1932, Extant) as Marcia Peterson
The Devil Is Driving (1932, Extant) as Nancy Evans
The Secrets of Wu Sin (1932, Extant) as Nona Gould
Law and Order (1932, Extant)
Obey the Law (1933, Extant, Library of Congress) as Grace Chester
Laughing at Life (1933) as Mrs. McHale
Deluge (1933, Extant) as Helen Webster
In the Money  (1933) as Mary 'Lambie' Higginbottom
Female (1933, Extant) as Harriet
The Show-Off (1934, Extant) as Clara Harling
No Greater Glory (1934) as Nemeecsek's Mother
School for Girls (1934) as Miss Cartwright
There's Always Tomorrow (1934) as Sophie White
Ticket to a Crime (1934) as Elaine Purdy
Bright Eyes (1934) as Mary Blake
Life Returns (1935) as Dr. Louise Stone
Public Opinion (1935) as Mona Trevor / Anne Trevor
Society Fever (1935) as Portia Prouty
Born to Gamble (1935) as Paula Mathews
Cappy Ricks Returns (1935) as Florry Peasley
Your Uncle Dudley (1935) as Christine Saunders
The Return of Jimmy Valentine (1936) as Mary Davis
Wedding Present (1936) as Laura Dodacker
Laughing at Trouble (1936) as Alice Mathews
Bad Little Angel (1939) as Mrs. Ellen Creighton
 Nobody's Children (1940) as Miss Jamieson
For Beauty's Sake (1941) as Mrs. Lloyd Kennar
The Girl from Jones Beach (1949) as Mrs. Wilson

References

External links

 
 
 Biodata, allmovie.com 
 
 Photographs and literature on Lois Wilson

1894 births
1988 deaths
American film actresses
American silent film actresses
American television actresses
Actresses from Pittsburgh
Deaths from pneumonia in Nevada
Burials at Forest Lawn Memorial Park (Glendale)
University of West Alabama alumni
Actresses from Alabama
Screenwriters from Pennsylvania
American women screenwriters
American women film directors
20th-century American actresses
WAMPAS Baby Stars
20th-century American women writers
20th-century American screenwriters